Swanson Mountains is a mountain range 8 nautical miles (15 km) long, standing 6 nautical miles (11 km) southeast of Saunders Mountain in the Ford Ranges, Marie Byrd Land. Discovered on aerial flights by the Byrd Antarctic Expedition in 1934 and named for the Hon. Claude A. Swanson, Secretary of the Navy, 1933–39.

See also
Mount Crabtree
Mount Fonda
Mount Passel
Mount Treadwell
Wells Ridge

References

Ford Ranges